The Revista Brasileira de Psiquiatria is the official journal of the Associação Brasileira de Psiquiatria (ABP - Brazilian Association of Psychiatry). It is published quarterly, and was formerly titled Revista ABP. Its purpose is to publish original works from all areas of psychiatry, focusing on public health, clinical epidemiology, basic sciences, and mental health problems. The journal also publishes two annual supplements, focusing mainly on clinical updating.

External links
 

Multilingual journals
Psychiatry journals
Quarterly journals
Open access journals
Publications established in 1979
Healthcare in Brazil
Academic journals published by learned and professional societies of Brazil